C11, C.XI, C-11 or C.11 may refer to:

Transport
 C-11 Fleetster, a 1920s American light transport aircraft for use of the United States Assistant Secretary of War
 Fokker C.XI, a 1935 Dutch reconnaissance seaplane 
 LET C-11, a license-build variant of the Soviet Yakovlev Yak-11 trainer aircraft
 C-11 Gulfstream II, the military designation of the Gulfstream II business jet
 Barroso (C11), a light cruiser of the Brazilian Navy
 HMS C11, a 1907 British Royal Navy C class submarine
 HMS Liverpool (C11), a 1937 British Royal Navy Town class light cruiser
 JNR Class C11, a class of Japanese steam locomotives
 USS Marblehead (C-11), an 1892 light cruiser of the United States Navy
 BSA C11, a British motorcycle manufactured between 1939 and 1956
 Mercedes-Benz C11, a 1990 Group C prototype race car 
 London Buses route C11, a public transportation route in England
 LNER Class C11, a class of British steam locomotives

Science and technology
 C11 (C standard revision), standardized version of the C programming language 
 Head and neck cancer (ICD-10 code)
 Eye diseases, (MeSH code); see List of MeSH codes (C11) 
 Carbon-11, an unstable isotope of the chemical element Carbon
 Caldwell 11, the Bubble Nebula, an emission nebula in the constellation Cassiopeia

Other uses
 C11 (rifle), a competition and training weapon used by members of the Royal Canadian Army Cadets
 C11 Right of Association (Agriculture) Convention, 1921
 Bill C-11, various articles of legislation of the Parliament of Canada 
 French Defence (Encyclopaedia of Chess Openings code)
 11th century

See also
 11C (disambiguation)